The Silver Jubilee Bridge (originally the Runcorn–Widnes Bridge or informally the Runcorn Bridge) crosses the River Mersey and the Manchester Ship Canal at Runcorn Gap between Runcorn and Widnes in Halton, England. It is a through arch bridge with a main arch span of 361 yards (330 m). It was opened in 1961 as a replacement for the Widnes-Runcorn Transporter Bridge. In 1975–77 the carriageway was widened, after which the bridge was given its official name in honour of the Queen's Silver Jubilee. It carries the A533 road and a cantilevered footway. The bridge is recorded in the National Heritage List for England as a designated Grade II listed building. The bridge was closed to vehicles for refurbishment upon the opening of the new Mersey Gateway Bridge, but reopened as a toll bridge in February 2021.

History

Before construction
Until 1868, when Runcorn Railway Bridge was opened, the only means of crossing the Mersey at or near Runcorn Gap were by fording or by ferry,  with the lowest crossing of the river being the road bridge at Warrington.  The first bridge to carry vehicular traffic across Runcorn Gap was the Widnes-Runcorn Transporter Bridge which opened in 1905. This was an inefficient means of transport and it had become inadequate for the amount of traffic using it before the outbreak of World War II. In 1946 the Ministry of Transport agreed that the transporter bridge should be replaced when sufficient funds were available. Mott, Hay and Anderson were appointed as consultant engineers.

Planning

The new bridge had to allow the passage of shipping along the Manchester Ship Canal. Many ideas were considered, including a new transporter bridge or a swing bridge. These were considered to be impractical and it was decided that the best solution was a high-level bridge upstream from the railway bridge. This would allow the least obstruction to shipping and would also be at the narrowest crossing point. The first plan for a high-level bridge was a truss bridge with three or five spans, giving an  dual carriageway with a cycle track and footpaths. This was abandoned because it was too expensive, and because one of the piers would be too close to the wall of the ship canal. However aerodynamic tests on models of the bridge showed that, while the bridge itself would be stable, the presence of the adjacent railway bridge would cause severe oscillation.

The finally accepted design was for a steel through arch bridge with a  single carriageway. The design of the bridge is similar to that of Sydney Harbour Bridge but differs from it in that the side spans are continuous with the main span rather than being separate from them. This design feature was necessary to avoid the problem of oscillation due to the railway bridge.

Construction

Construction began on 25 April 1956. The contractors for the first phase of work, Leonard Fairclough of Adlington, cleared the ground and constructed the foundations for the piers. The contract for the second phase, the building of the main arch and the side arches, was given to Dorman Long of Middlesbrough who sub-contracted the building of the bridge deck, viaduct and roadworks to Leonard Fairclough. Building of the bridge itself began in March 1958 and the side spans were completed by November 1959. The main arch was built by cantilevering steelwork from the side spans until it met in the middle in November 1960. The carriageway was suspended from the arch by 48 lock-coil wire ropes. The approaches on the Runcorn side blocked the Bridgewater Canal at Waterloo Bridge and the line of locks leading down to the Mersey were filled in. The bridge was officially opened as the Runcorn-Widnes Bridge by Princess Alexandra on 21 July 1961. Since creation it has always been painted in a light shade of green.

Structure, specifications and costs

During its construction 720,000 rivets were used. During its construction 5,900 tons of steel were used and 7,500 tons of concrete. The bridge requires constant repainting, with each coat using  of paint. The cost of constructing the bridge was £2,433,000. At the time of its construction it had the third longest steel arch span in the world. It had the longest vehicular span in the country, but this record was held for only a few weeks until the Tamar Bridge was completed. By 2001 it was the 10th longest steel arch bridge, and at that time was just  short of having Europe's largest span.

Usage

The bridge transformed Runcorn from an effective cul-de-sac into a town with through traffic. Road communications between north Cheshire and south Lancashire were immediately improved. Trade at the Port of Runcorn increased sixfold between 1960 and 1970. The presence of the bridge enabled the development of the New Town in Runcorn in the late 1960s and the 1970s. The amount of traffic using the bridge trebled between 1961 and 1970; this led to such severe congestion that in 1965 the first of two road widenings took place with a lane being added down the middle of the bridge (commonly referred to as the suicide lane). By 1975 traffic had increased to 40,000 vehicles per day and the bridge was widened again adding a fourth lane; the approach roads were improved creating a better flow on and off the bridge. The carriageway was widened by incorporating the footpaths, giving it four lanes, and a cantilevered foot-way was built on the east side of the bridge. This work was completed in 1977 and in that year the bridge was renamed from Runcorn Bridge to the Silver Jubilee Bridge to commemorate the Queen's Silver Jubilee.  Since 1994 the bridge has been illuminated at night by floodlights. Repairs to chloride corrosion of the bridge's deck were carried out in the early 21st century using an innovative electrolytic method; they were shortlisted for the Prime Minister's Award for Better Public Building of 2010.

Refurbishment

Traffic on the bridge continued to grow to over 80,000 vehicles a day, and there was frequent congestion.  In order to alleviate this, a further crossing was built, known as the Mersey Gateway Bridge. This is a six-lane toll bridge to the east of the Silver Jubilee Bridge that opened on 14 October 2017. Following the opening of the Mersey Gateway, the Silver Jubilee bridge was immediately closed to vehicles for refurbishment, after which it reopened with tolls applied to both bridges. It reopened with a single lane of vehicle traffic in each direction and a new cycle and footpath. The road network on the Runcorn side of the bridge was reconfigured. The West Viaduct, also known as the "Trumpet Loop", was demolished and replaced with a roundabout, with the land recovered from the viaduct used for new leisure and retail space. 

The bridge, now a toll bridge, reopened to all traffic on 26 February 2021.

See also

Listed buildings in Runcorn (urban area)
List of longest arch bridge spans

Notes and references
Notes

Citations

Sources

Further reading

External links

Grade II listed buildings in Cheshire
Bridges in Cheshire
Bridges completed in 1961
River Mersey
Through arch bridges in the United Kingdom
Buildings and structures in Runcorn
Buildings and structures in Widnes
Road bridges in England
Bridges across the River Mersey
Roads in Cheshire